The 2018 BWF season was the overall badminton circuit organized by the Badminton World Federation (BWF) for the 2018 badminton season to publish and promote the sport. The world badminton tournament in 2018 consisted of:

1. BWF Tournaments (Grade 1; Major Events)
BWF Men and Women's World Team Championships (Thomas & Uber Cup)
BWF World Championships

2. BWF World Tour (Grade 2)
Level 1 (BWF World Tour Finals)
Level 2 (BWF World Tour Super 1000)
Level 3 (BWF World Tour Super 750)
Level 4 (BWF World Tour Super 500)
Level 5 (BWF World Tour Super 300)
Level 6 (BWF Tour Super 100)

3. Continental Circuit (Grade 3)
BWF Open Tournaments: BWF International Challenge, BWF International Series, and BWF Future Series.

The Thomas Cup & Uber Cup were teams events. The others – Super 1000, Super 750, Super 500, Super 300, Super 100, International Challenge, International Series, and Future Series were all individual tournaments. The higher the level of tournament, the larger the prize money and the more ranking points available.

The 2018 BWF season calendar comprised these six levels of BWF tournaments.

Schedule
This is the complete schedule of events on the 2018 calendar, with the Champions and Runners-up documented.
Key

January

February

March

April

May

June

July

August

September

October

November

December

BWF Gala Awards Night 
The followings are the nominees and the winners of the 2018 BWF Gala Awards Night. Winners are marked in bold.

References

External links
 Badminton World Federation (BWF) at www.bwfbadminton.org

2018 in badminton
Badminton World Federation seasons